The Great Western Railway (GWR) 4700 Class was a class of nine 2-8-0 steam locomotives, designed by George Jackson Churchward. They were introduced in 1919 for heavy mixed-traffic work. Although primarily designed for fast freight, the class also sometimes hauled passenger trains, notably heavy holiday expresses in the summer months. They were called "Night Owls" because they were primarily designed to haul goods during the night and that they could be seen simmering in the daylight, awaiting their nocturnal duties.

Background
At the end of the First World War, the running department of the GWR identified the need for a larger version of the successful GWR 4300 Class 2-6-0 incorporating the Swindon No. 1 boiler. They envisaged a smaller version of the successful Saint class 4-6-0 with  driving wheels - the intermediate of Churchward's three standard wheel sizes, for express goods trains. However, Churchward preferred a 2-8-0 design for this purpose.

Prototype
The prototype of the new class was built at Swindon Works in May 1919 (Lot 214) and was the last design by Churchward. It was numbered 4700. According to the RCTS monograph, the design was not successful as built because the No. 1 boiler proved to be inadequate for such a large engine. In May 1921, it was therefore rebuilt with a newly designed and larger Swindon No. 7 boiler. However, according to Cook it was built with a Standard No. 1 boiler as the intended design of the larger Standard No. 7 boiler, which was not yet ready.

Production Series
Eight further locomotives with the larger No. 7 boilers and detail differences were ordered by Churchward in 1921 (Lot 221), but these only appeared after his retirement. These were numbered 4701 to 4708. Although they were mechanically successful locomotives, their large size severely restricted their route availability and so no more examples were built. Churchward's successor Charles Collett later rebuilt a Saint Class with  wheels to form the Hall Class which was a far more versatile mixed traffic locomotive. Later, Collett would produce the Grange Class which was exactly as the traffic department had originally envisaged: a 4-6-0 with Standard No. 1 boiler and 5 ft 8 in driving wheels.
The class were originally fitted with  tenders but during 1933/4 these were replaced by  tenders.

Use
The class were primarily used on fast overnight freight services on the London, Exeter and Plymouth, London-Bristol and London, Birmingham and Wolverhampton routes. In later years they were often used on heavy relief passenger services to the West of England during the summer months.

Accidents and incidents
On 12 November 1958, locomotive No. 4707 was hauling a freight train when it overran signals and was derailed at Highworth Junction, Swindon, Wiltshire. A newspaper train collided with the wreckage.

Withdrawal
Withdrawal of the class began in June 1962 with No. 4702, while the last were removed from service in May 1964.

Preservation
No members of the class were preserved. However, the Great Western Society 4709 Group made the decision to create the next locomotive in the sequence, GWR 4709. Supported via a GWS sub-group; the plan was to build it using a mixture of new parts and others recycled from former Barry scrapyard locomotives:
 GWR 5101 class 2-6-2T 4115 - six of the eight driving wheels and the frame extension.
 GWR 2800 class 2-8-0 2861 - the cylinder block.
 GWR 5205 class 2-8-0T 5227 - the axleboxes, horns and other various components.
 GWR 4073 Class  4-6-0 7027 Thornbury Castle - the boiler.

The plates for the new frames were cut and machined in 2012.

In order to fit within the more restrictive modern loading gauge, so that it could operate on the main line, the project has changed the plan to use the 2800 cylinder, and has instead had new cylinders designed and cast.

See also 
 List of GWR standard classes with two outside cylinders

References 

 
 
  ( (as of 27 April 2006))

External links
4709 Restoration project
Great Western Society 47XX Project

4700
2-8-0 locomotives
Railway locomotives introduced in 1919
Scrapped locomotives
Freight locomotives
Standard gauge steam locomotives of Great Britain